Chrysobatrachus is a genus of frogs in the family Hyperoliidae. It is monotypic, being represented by the single species, Chrysobatrachus cupreonitens. It is endemic to the Itombwe Mountains in the eastern Democratic Republic of the Congo.

During the dry season, it has been recorded in marshes and streams, grasses and heathers. The marshes get flooded during the rainy season. Reproduction takes place in pools of water, as evidenced by calling males and pairs in amplexus.

The species is considered "Endangered" because of its relatively small range and threats to its habitat from grazing, agriculture and mining.

References

Hyperoliidae
Monotypic amphibian genera
Amphibians described in 1951
Endemic fauna of the Democratic Republic of the Congo
Amphibians of the Democratic Republic of the Congo
Taxa named by Raymond Laurent
Taxonomy articles created by Polbot